Marko Grgić (born 30 June 1987) is a Croatian retired football forward. Marko was called up for the Croatian national under-21 team in 2008, but never got capped.

Club career
Born in Mostar, Grgić went through the ranks of Čitluk's NK Brotnjo before moving in 2005 to the HNK Hajduk Split academy. After a season there, he wasn't given a professional contract and was released on a free transfer, only to be snapped up by NK Zagreb, led by Miroslav Blažević who saw in the young player a way to get back at Hajduk's chairman Branko Grgić - who shares his surname, and who had previously sacked Blažević, claiming that he was better than Luka Modrić. Grgić debuted against Hajduk, coming in the 19.8.2006 away fixture for Ivan Lajtman at the half-time of the 2-0 loss, managing a yellow card 10 minutes after. He remained at the club until the beginning of 2010, when he moved to NK Međimurje, with whom he was relegated to the Druga HNL. In the beginning of 2011, he was signed by NK Široki Brijeg and sent immediately on a loan to the high-flying Prva Liga BiH team NK GOŠK Gabela, where he achieved promotion to the Premijer Liga BiH. Recalled to Široki Brijeg, he spent the following autumn there, but achieved only two caps there before being sent back on loan to NK GOŠK Gabela, where he would go on to sign a professional contract in the summer of 2012. The contract was rescinded, however, in the beginning of 2013 and he moved to the Treća HNL Jug side NK Neretvanac Opuzen.

References

External links
Marko Grgić profile at Nogometni Magazin 

1987 births
Living people
Sportspeople from Mostar
Association football forwards
Association football midfielders
Croatian footballers
Bosnia and Herzegovina footballers
NK Zagreb players
NK Međimurje players
NK Široki Brijeg players
NK GOŠK Gabela players
NK Brotnjo players
Croatian Football League players
Premier League of Bosnia and Herzegovina players
Second Football League (Croatia) players
First League of the Federation of Bosnia and Herzegovina players